Annie Get Your Gun – 1986 London Cast is an album from the first London revival of Irving Berlin's musical Annie Get Your Gun, starring American rock musician Suzi Quatro as Annie Oakley and Eric Flynn as Frank Butler. The revival was a David Gilmore Chichester Festival Theatre production. It toured in the UK and then moved to the Aldwych Theatre in London's West End.

The album was initially released on the First Night/Pinnacle record label as Annie Get Your Gun (1986 London revival cast) and is sometimes (ambiguously) called Annie Get Your Gun (Original London Cast Recording) or Annie Get Your Gun: Original London Cast Recording. It is Quatro's ninth studio album.

Background 
The musical Annie Get Your Gun is based on a book of the same name, written by Herbert and Dorothy Fields. The story covers Oakley's romance with Butler while they were exhibition shooters in Buffalo Bill's Wild West show. In real life, Butler became Oakley's manager when she became the star attraction in Buffalo Bill's Wild West show. Oakley then became the first American female superstar.

 

On 12 April 1982 Quatro appeared in a BBC television program called An Evening with Andrew Lloyd Webber. During his show, Webber suggested that Quatro should star in Annie Get Your Gun.

Names
According to its publisher, this album is called Annie Get Your Gun – 1986 London Cast.

It was originally released as Annie Get Your Gun (1986 London revival cast).

The album is sometimes ambiguously referred to as Annie Get Your Gun (Original London Cast Recording) or Annie Get Your Gun: Original London Cast Recording. The term "original cast recording" is ambiguous because it can mean either the cast of the first ever performance of a musical in a particular city, or the cast of the première of a particular production (which may be a revival). The album's cover contains the words "Original London Cast Recording" and its catalogue number contains the characters "OCR" (which stand for Original Cast Recording). This 1986 production is actually the first West End (London) revival of the musical — the first ever London performance of Annie Get Your Gun (starring Dolores Gray) was in 1947.

Recording, production
There were different teams of producers for the theatre and the album.

John Gale was the executive producer for the theatre, with Al Waxman and Anita Waxman as associate producers.

Robert Mackintosh was executive producer for the album, with Norman Newell as record producer. The album was recorded at Olympic Studios, Barnes, on 14–15 July 1986.

Touring
15 April 1986 – 14 June 1986: Annie Get Your Gun opened at the Chichester Festival Theatre.

21 June 1986 – 12 July 1986: the production then moved to the Theatre Royal, Plymouth.

29 July 1986 – 4 October 1986: finally, the musical moved to the Aldwych Theatre in the London's West End.

Track listing
All songs were written by Irving Berlin.

Personnel
 Main players

 Roger Alborough Pawnee's messenger, Mr Schulyer Adams
 John Conroy Mac
 Eric Flynn Frank Butler
 Steve Fortune railwayman, majordomo
 Anne Grayson Mrs Sylvia Potter-Porter
 Edmund Hockridge Buffalo Bill
 Michael G. Jones Pawnee Bill
 Berwick Kaler Foster Wilson, Chief Sitting Bull
 Peter Ledbury railwayman
 Peter Lucadou-Wells The Wild Horse
 Tony O'Rourke railwayman, Mr Clay
 Tony Pedretti conductor
 Suzi Quatro Annie Oakley
 Maureen Scott Dolly Tate
 Sarah Woollett Mrs Schulyer Adams
 Matt Zimmerman Charlie Davenport

 Indians, cowboys, girls, and ball guests

 Roger Alborough (also a main player)
 Francesca Coker
 Richard Cuerden
 Steve Fortune (also a main player)
 Adam Goodfellow
 Anne Grayson (also a main player)
 Karen Halliday
 Peter Ledbury (also a main player)
 Peter Lucadou-Wells (also a main player)
 Tony O'Rourke (also a main player)
 Tony Pedretti (also a main player)
 Mikaela Ryden
 Robin Salter
 Taffy Taylor
 Tricia Tomlinson
 Nichola Treherne
 Helene Whitcombe
 Sarah Woollett(also a main player)

 Kids

 Rosie Freshwater Nellie
 Richard Hanson-Smith Little Jake
 Abigail Painter Minnie
 Tiffany-Alice Pershke Jessie

 Orchestra

 Andy Barnwell woodwinds
 Dennis Bowden bass
 Myrtle Bruce-Mitford cello
 Colin Courtney woodwinds
 Fred Crossman horn
 Leslie Davis violin
 Ruth Dawson violin
 Martin Gill violin
 Mark Graham trombone
 David Hulley percussion
 Grant Hossack production musical director
 Dave Land trumpet
 Rosalyn Lishak violin
 Louise Martin harp
 Andy Mitchell trumpet
 John Mayer violin
 Andy Panayi woodwinds
 Robert Purvis assistant musical director, keyboards
 Michael Rennie leader

 Production, etc.

 Toby Alington assistant recording engineer
 Bill Bray lighting design
 Richard Bush sleeve artwork
 Deirdre Clancy costume design
 John Craig co-ordinated for First Night Records
 David Firman music supervision and arrangement
 John Gale executive producer (theatre)
 Matthew Gale sound design
 David Gilmore director
 Roger Glossop set design
 Keith Grant recording engineer
 Suzanne Hywel choreography (assistant)
 Jon King assistant recording engineer
 Michael Lynas with thanks to ... 
 Robert Mackintosh executive producer (album)
 Jerome Minskoff presented by ...
 James M. Nederlander presented by ...
 Norman Newell record producer
 Gerry O'Riordan (incorrectly spelt Gerry O'Riordon in the CD booklet) assistant recording engineer
 Anthony Van Laast choreography
 Duncan C. Weldon presented by ...
 Al Waxman associate producer (theatre)
 Anita Waxman associate producer (theatre)

Release history

On 3 October 1986, Quatro's songs "I Got Lost in His Arms" and "You Can't Get a Man with a Gun" were released as a single.

Quatro's "I Got Lost in His Arms" has also been included in the compilation albums The Divas Collection (2003) and Songs from the Greatest Musicals (2008).

References

Suzi Quatro albums
Cast recordings
1986 albums
Theatre soundtracks
Cultural depictions of Annie Oakley
Cultural depictions of Sitting Bull
Cultural depictions of Buffalo Bill